Goran Rakić (born 1971) is a Kosovo Serb politician who was serving as Minister for Communities and Returns in the Government of Kosovo from 22 March 2021 until his resignation on 5 November 2022. Prior to this, he served as the Deputy Prime Minister of Kosovo and as the Minister of Administration and Local Government. He is a former mayor of North Mitrovica and the current president of the Serb List, an ethnic Serb minority political party.

Early life 
Goran Rakić was born in 1971 in Titova Mitrovica (Kosovska Mitrovica / Mitrovica) which was then a part of the SFR Yugoslavia, to an ethnic Serb family. He graduated from the Faculty of Economics, University of Priština. He was employed as the director of JKP "Standard" Kosovska Mitrovica, and before that in the Fire Station Kosovska Mitrovica.

Political career 
He has been performing the function of the mayor of the municipality of North Mitrovica after swearing an oath to the Republic of Kosovo in 2014. He won his second four-year term in 2017 Kosovan local elections. Since 2017, Rakic has been the president of the Serb List, which has power in all ten Serb-majority municipalities, as well as all ten guaranteed seats in the Assembly of Kosovo for the Serb community. He is also the president of the municipality board of the Serbian Progressive Party in North Mitrovica.

In the summer of 2017, Rakić and Milan Radoičić, a vice president of the Serb List met with Behgjet Pacolli, a former Minister of Foreign Affairs of Kosovo in Budva to discuss the possibility of the Serb List joining the government of Kosovo and supporting Ramush Haradinaj as the prime minister.

In January 2019, he said that Serbs will never allow the reunification of North and South Mitrovica as that would be a cover for ethnic cleansing against the Kosovo Serbs.

On 3 June 2020, he took the office of one of the Deputy Prime Ministers and the Minister of Administration and Local Government in the Hoti cabinet.

In July 2020, Serb List caused a controversy in Kosovo by announcing that they will support Serbia's COVID-19 curfew measures and have vowed to locally implement them in Kosovo. They also vowed to support Aleksandar Vučić in the “fight” for Kosovo during the dialogue. Shortly after, a parliamentary resolution initiated by Vjosa Osmani, the Speaker of the Parliament, condemning a statement by the Serb List failed to pass.

On 27 July 2020, Serbian Anti-Corruption Agency started an investigation against Rakić and other high ranking Serb officials in Kosovo due to the suspicion that they violated the law because they did not report their property and income to the Anti-Corruption Agency.

On 22 March 2021, Rakić took office of the Minister for Communities and Returns in the second Kurti cabinet. He announced his resignation from this position on 5 November 2022.

Personal life 
He is married and has two children.

Notes and references
Notes

References

External links
 Српска листа - Косово и Метохија - Званични сајт

|-

1971 births
Living people
Politicians from Mitrovica, Kosovo
Deputy Prime Ministers of Kosovo
Kosovo Serbs
Kosovan politicians
Serbian politicians
Serbian Progressive Party politicians
Government ministers of Kosovo
Mayors of places in Serbia
Mayors of places in Kosovo